Sarab-e Naniz (also Romanized as Sarāb-e Nanīz, Sarāb-e Nānīz, Sarāb-i-Nanīz, and Sar Āb Nanīz; also known as Sarāb-e Nīz) is a village in Emamzadeh Jafar Rural District, in the Central District of Gachsaran County, Kohgiluyeh and Boyer-Ahmad Province, Iran. At the 2006 census, its population was 902, in 203 families.

References 

Populated places in Gachsaran County